Gugutka ("collared dove") is a village in southernmost Bulgaria, part of Ivaylovgrad municipality, Haskovo Province.  Located in the valley of the Byala Reka ("White River"), it is famous for the Byalgrad ("White Fortress") medieval fortress located eight kilometres from the village. Its former name was "Arnavutköy".

Villages in Haskovo Province